Chinkultic, sometimes Chincultic, is a moderate-size archeological ruin in the state of Chiapas, Mexico.  It is part of the Lagunas de Montebello National Park.

This pre-Columbian city belongs to the ancient Maya civilization. The city flourished in the Maya Classic Era, from about the 3rd through the 9th century. Most of the sculptures were produced in the last 300 years of this era, with hieroglyphic inscriptions dating from 591 to 897.  Post-Classic-Era occupation of the site continued until the 13th century, after which it was abandoned.

The site has some step-pyramids and some 200 smaller buildings, most in undisturbed ruin. Chinkultic has carved stone stelae depicting the site's rulers.  The site contains a court for playing the Mesoamerican ballgame, which a marker tells us was dedicated on 21 May 591.

The first published account of the site was made by Edward Seler in the late 19th century. A detailed description of the site was made by Enrique Juan Palacios in 1926.

The first archeological investigations of the site were conducted in 1966 under the direction of Stephan F. de Borhegyi of the Public Museum of Milwaukee, Wisconsin.

Starting in 1970, some further excavations and restorations of a few buildings was conducted by Mexican government archeologists, who also dredged some artifacts from the site's cenote or natural well known as Agua Azul ("Blue Water"). The cenote gives the site its Maya language name; Chinkultic meaning "stepped-cenote".

The site is open for tourism visits, although it is not one of the more commonly visited Maya sites.

References

Further reading 
 Chinkultic, Una ciudad Maya, by Roberto Gallegos Ruiz (in Spanish)

Maya sites in Chiapas
Former populated places in Mexico
Populated places established in the 3rd century
3rd-century establishments in the Maya civilization
Tourist attractions in Chiapas
Maya sites that survived the end of the Classic Period